Molvin James (born 4 May 1989) is an Antiguan footballer who currently plays for Antigua Barracuda FC in the USL Professional Division.

Club career
James began his career with Young Warriors in the Antiguan First Division, before moving to Villa Lions in the Antigua and Barbuda Premier Division in 2007.

After 4 seasons with Villa Lions, James signed with Antigua Barracuda FC in the USL Professional Division. He made his debut for the club on 17 April 2011 in a 2-1 loss against the Los Angeles Blues.

International career
James made his debut for the Antigua and Barbuda national team in 2007. He played in two of Antigua's qualification games for the 2010 FIFA World Cup, both against Cuba, but unfortunately conceded 8 goals in the process. He was also part of the Antigua squad which took part on the final stages of the 2010 Caribbean Championship.

References

External links
 

1989 births
Living people
Antigua and Barbuda footballers
Antigua and Barbuda international footballers
Antigua Barracuda F.C. players
USL Championship players
2014 Caribbean Cup players
Association football goalkeepers